Rafael 'Rafa' Reis Pereira (born 26 May 2001) is a Portuguese professional footballer who plays as a midfielder for Varaždin.

Club career
Pereira made his professional debut for FC Porto B in a 2–2 away draw against U.D. Oliveirense on 23 September 2020.

References

External links

2001 births
Living people
Portuguese footballers
Sportspeople from Coimbra
Portugal youth international footballers
Association football midfielders
Liga Portugal 2 players
FC Porto B players
Padroense F.C. players
Vitória S.C. B players